And Then We Danced is a 2019 Georgian drama film directed by Levan Akin. It was premiered in the Directors' Fortnight section at the 2019 Cannes Film Festival where it received a fifteen-minute standing ovation. It was one of the most favourably reviewed films out of Cannes that year. It was selected as the Swedish entry for the Best International Feature Film at the 92nd Academy Awards, but it was not nominated. Screening of the film in Georgia sparked protests, due to its portrayal of a gay love affair.

Development
In an interview with the Zurich Film Festival, director Levin Akin said that he was inspired by images of the 2013 Tbilisi anti-homophobia rally protests where dozens of young people protesting homophobia were violently attacked by thousands of counter-protesters from the Georgian Orthodox Church. He visited Tbilisi in 2016 to do research on the situation and was inspired to make the film as a discussion on the development of tradition and identity as opposed to a more conventional coming out narrative.

The film was logistically difficult to shoot. Due to the nature of the film and prevalent homophobia in Georgia, an alternative story was told to onlookers that the film was about a French tourist who falls in love with Georgian culture. Actors and locations that agreed to be in the film would later refuse to participate due to the nature of the film or fear of backlash. The production crew received death threats and had to hire security while on set. Both lead actors Levan Gelbakhiani and Bachi Valishvili, who were contacted by Akin via social media, initially refused the offered roles due to concerns about backlash in Georgia and how it would affect their future careers.

Plot

Merab (Levan Gelbakhiani) is a young man and dedicated Georgian dancer training at the National Georgian Ensemble with his partner and pseudo-girlfriend, Mary (Ana Javakhishvili), and his deadbeat, delinquent brother David (Giorgi Tsereteli). One day, a rehearsal is interrupted by the arrival of Irakli (Bachi Valishvili), a replacement dancer. Though Irakli rankles some of the other dancers as well as the choreographer, Aleko (Kakha Gogidze), with his smug and rebellious attitude, he quickly proves himself to be a natural talent and replaces Merab in a dance, as Aleko had criticized him for not being masculine and rigid enough. Merab is initially jealous of Irakli's talent, as Irakli has been dancing for much less time than he has, but when the two start rehearsing together early in the morning, they begin to bond. A friendly rivalry forms as they compete for a coveted spot in the main ensemble, though Mary learns that the spot is vacant because the previous male dancer had been caught having sex with another man, leading him to be severely beaten by the other dancers and sacked. Later, we hear that his family sent him to a monastery to be cured but a monk took advantage of him so he escaped. But since his family won't take him back he has to resort to prostitution to survive.

Merab visits his father, who, with Merab's mother, used to be part of the dance ensemble. His father implores him to give up his passion and attend school, as there is no future in dance; furthermore, Aleko dislikes their family, and has been biased against him and David as a result. Meanwhile, Merab and Irakli become friends, and Merab grows increasingly attracted to him. On a trip with friends to visit Mary's father, Merab and Irakli succumb to their mutual attraction and have sex; though they remain discreet, Mary becomes suspicious of their closeness. Though the pair do not discuss their relationship, Merab performs a dance for Irakli in his own style as a means of communicating his feelings.

After the group returns home, Irakli disappears, and Merab is unable to contact him. After several missed practices, David finally arrives to the rehearsal, only to be forcibly removed by Aleko due to his frequent absences and criminal behavior. Merab secures a job for his brother at the restaurant where he works part-time, only for David to get them both fired for dealing drugs on the job, leading to a fight between him and Merab.

Despondent and missing Irakli, Merab spontaneously befriends a young male prostitute (they meet eyes on a bus and then recognise one another in the street) and goes with him to a gay bar and has a great time. Alas, he is seen leaving by another dancer, Luka. The next day, a hungover Merab performs poorly at practice and injures his ankle. While recovering with Mary, he finally receives a call from Irakli, who informs him that he is back in his hometown to take care of his ill father, and will probably not make the audition. Aleko discourages Merab from auditioning due to his behavior and injury, but Merab insists on continuing to practice. While leaving, he is heckled by Luka, and Mary implores him to be careful, as she does not want him to end up like the ensemble's former dancer.

Merab learns that David is having a rushed wedding, as he has gotten a girl pregnant. At the wedding, Merab spots Irakli in the crowd. Though Merab is glad to see him, Irakli admits that he is leaving the city and giving up dancing; his father has died and he has gotten engaged to his girlfriend in order to be close to and provide for his mother. Heartbroken, Merab leaves the reception before breaking down in tears in a sympathetic Mary's arms. At home, he is comforted by David, who reveals he was injured defending Merab's honor from Luka and the other dancers; when Merab admits that he is actually gay, David accepts him and encourages him to get out of Georgia in order to reach his full potential.

On the day of the audition, Mary shows up to support Merab. Merab dances passionately despite his healing ankle, but is nevertheless dismissed by the unimpressed director. Merab continues anyway, breaking away from the traditional dance to perform in his own unbridled, androgynous style; though the offended director storms out, Aleko stays to watch. After he is finished, Merab bows and departs.

Cast
 Levan Gelbakhiani as Merab
 Bachi Valishvili as Irakli
 Ana Javakishvili as Mary
 Giorgi Tsereteli as David
 Marika Gogichaishvil as grandmother Nona
 Kakha Gogidze as Aleko
 Tamar Bukhnikashvili as Teona
 Levan Gabrava as Luka
 Nino Gabisonia as Ninutsa
 Ana Makharadze as Sopo
 Aleko Begalishvili as Loseb
 Mate Khidasheli as Mate

Reception
On review aggregator website Rotten Tomatoes, the film has a "certified fresh" approval rating of  based on  reviews. The website's critical consensus reads, "Led by an outstanding performance from Levan Gelbakhiani, And Then We Danced defeats prejudice with overwhelming compassion." On Metacritic, the film has a score of 68% based on reviews from 20 critics, indicating "generally favourable reviews".

The film sold to more than 40 countries.

In July 2019, at the 10th Odessa International Film Festival, the film won the Grand Prix, decided by the audience, as well as the Best Film and Best Actor awards, decided by the international jury. In August 2019, Levan Gelbakhiani won the Heart of Sarajevo Award for Best Actor at the 25th Sarajevo Film Festival. In October 2019, the film won the Best Feature Film Award at the 2019 Iris Prize Festival. In January 2020, the film played in the prestigious Spotlight section at the Sundance Film Festival. It tied with Aniara for most awards at the 55th Guldbagge Awards, winning four awards including Best Film.

And Then We Danced was nominated for the 2021 GLAAD Media Award for Outstanding Film (Limited Release).

Screenings and protests

Ultra-conservative groups threatened to cancel the screening of the film in Tbilisi and Batumi, Georgia. The head of the Children Protection Public Movement Levan Palavandishvili, plus Levan Vasadze, Dimitri Lortkipanidze, and the leader of ultra-nationalist movement Georgian March Sandro Bregadze, announced they would picket the cinemas to protest against the showing of the film "which is against Georgian and Christian traditions and values, and popularises the sin of sodomy".

The director of the film, Levan Akin, responded to the threats, saying: "It is absurd that people who bought tickets need to be brave and risk getting harassed or even assaulted just for going to see a film. I made this film with love and compassion." The Georgian Orthodox Church disapproved of the film premiere but also stated that the “church distances itself from any violence.”

On 8 November 2019, the Ministry of Internal Affairs of Georgia mobilized police troops at the Amirani Cinema and nearby streets and placed special riot police troops near to the Philharmonic Hall. Police officers surrounded the entrance to the Amirani Cinema. Later that day several hundred members of Georgian March attempted to break the police cordon and forcibly enter the Amirani Cinema, but were stopped by the police. Some of the protesters wore masks and used pyrotechnics. Despite the attempts, all screenings of the film took place as planned.

The police detained two persons and accused them of violating Article 173 of the Code of Administrative Offences of Georgia (disobedience of lawful order of a police officer) and Article 166 (hooliganism). One of the leaders of the Republican Party of Georgia, Davit Berdzenishvili, was attacked by the protesters. Civil activist Ana Subeliani was also heavily injured in a clash with protesters and taken to hospital.

See also
 List of submissions to the 92nd Academy Awards for Best International Feature Film
 List of Swedish submissions for the Academy Award for Best International Feature Film

References

External links
 

2019 films
2019 drama films
2019 LGBT-related films
2010s dance films
Best Film Guldbagge Award winners
Dance in Georgia (country)
Drama films from Georgia (country)
Films set in Tbilisi
Films shot in Tbilisi
French dance films
French drama films
French LGBT-related films
Gay-related films
2010s Georgian-language films
LGBT-related controversies in film
LGBT-related drama films
LGBT-related films from Georgia (country)
Swedish drama films
Swedish LGBT-related films
2010s French films
2010s Swedish films